Sharon Lamb (born September 11, 1955), is an American professor in the Department of Counseling and School Psychology at the University of Massachusetts Boston's, College of Education and Human Development, and a fellow of the American Psychological Association (APA). She also sits on the editorial board of the academic journals Feminism & Psychology, and Sexualization, Media, and Society.

Lamb is one of the authors of the APA's report into the sexualization of girls, which according to an article on Women and Hollywood is "the most downloaded document in the history of the APA’s website". She is also a co-author for the APA's Guidelines for Psychological Practice with Girls and Women.

Sharon Lamb also practices psychology in Shelburne Vermont where she performs evaluations for the courts, attachment evaluations and custody evaluations, and sees private therapy clients.

Education 
Lamb gained both her EdD in Human Development, and her EdM in Counseling and Consulting Psychology from Harvard Graduate School of Education. She also obtained her PhD at the Free University (Vrije Universiteit) in Amsterdam, the Netherlands, under the supervision of philosophers Doret de Ruyter and Jan Steutel.

Personal life 
She is married to the pianist Paul Orgel and has/had two sons. Her younger son died on July 6, 2018, at the age of 26. Her older son lives with his family in Austin, Texas.

Grants and awards 
 2006 Books for a Better Life Award (Childcare/Parenting) for "Packaging Girlhood"
2007 "Gift of Time" Mid-Career Sabbatical Award from the Association for Moral Education to create a Sexual Ethics Curriculum, 
 2008 Society for Sex Therapy and Research (SSTAR) Health Professional Book Award for "Sex, Therapy, and Kids"
 2013 The Spencer Foundation, New Civics Initiative Grants for research into Sex Education as Ethics Education in the New Civics

Bibliography

Books 
 
 
 
 
 
 
 
 
 
 
Lamb, Sharon (2016). Girls of color, sexuality, and sex education, Palgrave/Macmillan.
Lamb, S. & Gilbert, J. Editors. (in press). Cambridge handbook of sexual development: Children and adolescents. Cambridge, UK: Cambridge University Press.
Lamb, S. (June 5, 2019). The not good enough mother, Boston: Beacon Press.

Chapters in books 
 
 
 
 
  Available online as: 
 
 
  Also available as 
Lamb, S. & Randazzo, R. (2016) Obstacles to teaching ethics in sexuality education. In J. Ponzetti (Ed.) Evidence-based approaches to sex education: A global perspective 113–129). NY: Routledge.
Lamb, S. & Brodt (2017). Psychotherapy with girls: The problems of real girls and the distractions of diagnosis.  In APA Handbook of the Psychology of Women. 
Lamb, S., White, L., & Plocha, A. (in press). Childhood sexuality. In S. Lamb & J. Gilbert (in press). Cambridge handbook of sexual development: Children and adolescents. 
Jarkovska, L., & Lamb, S. (in press).  Not innocent but vulnerable: An approach to childhood sexuality. In S. Lamb & J. Gilbert (in press). Cambridge handbook of sexual development: Children and adolescents.

Journal articles 
 
 
 
 
 
 
 
 
 
 
 
 
 
 
Lamb, S. & Plocha, A. (2015) Pride, shame, and sexiness: Girls of color discuss race, body image, and sexualization. Girlhood Studies, 8(2), 86–102. DOI: 10.3167/ghs.2015.080207
Randazzo, R., Farmer, K., & Lamb, S. (2015). Queer women's perspectives on sexualization in media. Journal of Bisexuality, 15(1), 1-31. DOI: 10.1080/15299716.2014.986315
Lamb, S., Farmer, K., Kosterina, E., Lambe Sarinana, S., Plocha, A., & Randazzo, R. (2015). What's sexy? Adolescent girls discuss confidence, danger, and media influence. Gender & Education, 28(4), 527-545. DOI:10.1080/09540253.2015.1107528
Lamb, S., & Randazzo, R. (2016). An examination of the effectiveness of a sexual ethics curriculum. Journal of Moral Education. DOI: 10.1080/03057240.2016.1156520
Lamb, S., & Randazzo, R. (2016.) Sex education as a form of civics education in a neoliberal context. Curriculum Inquiry, 46(2), 148–167. DOI:10.1080/03626784.2016.1144465
Lamb, S., & Brodt, M. (2017). Sexual ethics curriculum evaluation: A buzzing, blooming, confusion in the classroom. Sage Research Methods Cases Part 2. Thousand Oaks, CA:Sage Press. DOI: 10.4135/9781473970670
Lamb, S., Kosterina, E., Roberts, T., Brodt, M., Maroney, M. & Dangler, L. (2017). Voices of the mind: Hegemonic masculinity and others in mind during young men's sexual encounters. Men & Masculinities. DOI:10.1177/1097184X17695038
Gable, S., Lamb, S., Brodt, M., & Attwell, L. (2017). Intervening in a ‘sketchy situation’: Exploring the moral motivations of college bystanders of sexual assault. Journal of Interpersonal Violence. DOI: 10.1177/0886260517730027

References

External links 
 Profile page: Sharon Lamb University of Massachusetts Boston
 Sharon Lamb (personal website)
 Sexual Ethics Curriculum by Sharon Lamb (online course)

21st-century American psychologists
American women psychologists
Men and masculinities scholars
Women's studies academics
School counseling
University of Massachusetts Boston faculty
Harvard Graduate School of Education alumni
1955 births
Living people
American women academics
21st-century American women
20th-century American psychologists